Toxabramis argentifer is a species of ray-finned fish in the genus Toxabramis. It is found in China.

References

Toxabramis
Freshwater fish of China
Fish described in 1901